Pablo García Pérez de Lara (born 29th October, 1970), is an Spanishn filmmaker and screenwriter. He is most notable as the director of critically acclaimed African documentaries such as Tchindas.

Personal life
He was born in 1970 in Barcelona, Spain. He studied at the Center d'Estudis Cinematogràfics de Catalunya (CECC).

Career
In 1996, he started his directorial debut with the film Fuente Álamo, the Caress of Time as a project grant from the Barcelona Alternativa festival. He completed the film in 2001 and then selected at the SEMINCI in Valladolid. The film had official selection in Karlovy Vary. Then in 2007, he made the film Butterfly which made the official section of Karlovy Vary and San Sebastián. In 2015, he made the critically acclaimed documentary Tchindas co-directed with Marc Serena. It was selected in several international film festivals and won 14 international awards. The film later won Outfest's Grand Jury Award for Excellence in Filmmaking.

In 2002, he made the short film Alicia Portrayed which was selected by the Cannes Film Festival's Critics' Week in 2003. In the meantime, Pablo made the two documentaries Son de Galicia in 2006 and Mura, un poble de cine in 2010 for television. Then he worked as the cinematographer of the critically acclaimed 2009 documentary Familystrip. In 2011, he made the documentary Oblidant a Nonot. It received the City of Alcalá award at Alcine 2011, as well as the Audience Award at l'Alternativa de Barcelona 2011 and Best Short Film in Sign Language at Cinemobile de Sevilla 2011. Then in 2012, he was the cinematographer of the film El efecto K. El montador de Stalin which was screened in 60 international festivals across the globe.

Filmography

See also
 Belfast Film Festival
 List of LGBT-related films of 2015

References

External links
 

Living people
Spanish film directors
Spanish screenwriters
1970 births
Spanish documentary film directors